The Southwest Times Record is a daily newspaper in Fort Smith, Arkansas and covers 10 counties in western Arkansas and eastern Oklahoma. It is owned and published by Gannett.

History 

The Times Record began as three separate papers: the Fort Smith Times, the Fort Smith News Record and the Southwest American.
The Fort Smith Times began publishing first, in December 1884, as an afternoon newspaper. The Fort Smith News Record was established in spring 1893 and also was an afternoon publication. The Southwest American, a morning daily, began publishing in 1907. In July 1909, the Times and the News Record merged as the Fort Smith Times Record.

In 1920, boyhood friends John S. Parks and George D. Carney purchased the Fort Smith Times Record, and in 1923, they also bought the American. They continued to publish the American in the morning and the Times Record in the evening, maintaining separate editorial staffs. On Sundays, the two combined into one edition — the Southwest Times Record.

On March 23, 1940, Parks and Carney sold the American and the Times Record to 33-year-old Donald W. Reynolds, owner of the Okmulgee (Okla.) Daily Times. His purchase of the Times Record and American marked the start of the Donrey Media Group.  In 1969, Donrey halted separate delivery of the afternoon Times Record and morning American, merging the papers into a single seven-day morning paper under the Southwest Times Record name. It has published daily under that moniker since.

The paper remained the flagship of Donrey until Reynolds' death in 1993.  Reynolds' longtime friend Jack Stephens bought the company, changed its name to Stephens Media Group in 2002 and later to Stephens Media LLC, and moved the headquarters to Las Vegas, Nevada, home of the group's largest property, the Las Vegas Review-Journal. In 2015, the Stephens Media newspapers were sold to New Media Investment Group.

Subsidiary Publications 

River Valley Advertiser (Fort Smith) 
Booneville Democrat  
Paris Express  
Press Argus-Courier (Crawford County)  
Charleston Express
Greenwood Life

References

External links 
Southwest Times Record official website
Southwest Times Record Facebook page
Southwest Times Record Twitter page
Southwest Times Record Instagram page

Newspapers published in Arkansas
Daily newspapers published in the United States
Gannett publications